Daniel Gowing (18 May 1971 – March 2017) was a New Zealand judoka. He competed at the 1996 Summer Olympics and the 2000 Summer Olympics.

References

External links
 

1971 births
2017 deaths
New Zealand male judoka
Olympic judoka of New Zealand
Judoka at the 1996 Summer Olympics
Judoka at the 2000 Summer Olympics
Sportspeople from Auckland